Sleepy Eye Lake is a lake in Le Sueur County, in the U.S. state of Minnesota.

Sleepy Eye Lake was named for Chief Sleepy Eye.

See also
List of lakes in Minnesota

References

Lakes of Minnesota
Lakes of Le Sueur County, Minnesota